Çobankol (also, Chobankël and Chobankol’) is a village and municipality in the Zaqatala Rayon of Azerbaijan.  It has a population of 4,212.  The municipality consists of the villages of Çobankol, Bazar, and Qımır. The postal code is AZ 6215.

References

External links

Populated places in Zaqatala District